His Majesty's chief inspector or HM chief inspector is the head of an inspectorate. They are often appointed from outside the organisation over which they have oversight.

List of chief inspectors

Dissolved appointments

References

British government officials
Government agencies of the United Kingdom
Inspectors general